BJFE Guitar Effects is a company which manufactures  effects pedals for use with instruments such as an electric guitar.  These pedals are commonly used by guitarists to modify the sound of their guitar before it reaches the amp.   The company is located in Sweden, and was founded in 2000 by Björn Juhl.  "BJFE" stands for  Björn Juhl Förstärkarelektronik (which is Swedish for Björn Juhl Amplifier Electronics).    Pedal types include distortion, overdrive, "vibe" (vibrato), compression, and equalization (EQ).   Due to the limited production and handbuilt nature, these pedals are considered "boutique" guitar effects.

BJFE pedals are all handmade by BJ and his wife Eva Juhl paints the lettering and pictures.  BJFE pedals typically follow a "color" naming scheme, and an adjective to describe the sound.  See below for examples.  Custom shop models are usually painted by Donner Rusk (aka "Donnerbox") in the USA.

BJFE drive pedals designs also tend to lend themselves well to "stacking", or cascading several pedals in successive order.  Björn has written a guide on this here.  Also, the drive pedals typically are dynamic in nature- showing different EQ or distortion depth as the input guitar level changes.  For example, the Honeybee overdrive may sound nearly clean with guitar volume at the lower range, but gritty and overdriven with the guitar volume at its maximum setting.

Founder history
Björn Juhl began creating models for production sale upon founding the company in 2000.  However, he began building effects units for guitar as early as 1981.   In 2000 Björn was displaying his repair skills at a guitar trade show, and made three pedals to demonstrate his skills.  Here he teamed up with Harri Koski from Custom Sounds in Stockholm, to begin a partnership distributing guitar effects which Björn designed to a worldwide customer base.

Björn Juhl has two kids, a daughter and a non binary child named Martina. His daughters name is Marlene and music is a big pleasure for her. She is going in her father's footsteps.

BJF Electronics initially started in June 1999 as an amp repair business.  Björn repaired all kinds of things from a Tubon (a kind of early synthesiser used as an electric bass by pop bands who couldn't afford a Fender Bass or a Hagstrom Bass), to a Music Man amp that had been used to test how to take the live and neutral currents out of a three phase connection. Björn handled the extreme and difficult cases that other repairmen wouldn't touch because they thought they'd take too much time or were considered hopeless repair opportunities.

Construction and philosophy
BJFE pedals are enclosed in a 110x60x30mm chassis, in an ELFA K-430 enclosure for most pedals. The circuit boards are wrapped in neoprene, which is a kind of rubber used in diving suits. The neoprene is capable of withstanding heat, water, and other fluids and it cushions the electronic components inside.  The circuit board is also sealed to preserve trade secrets.

The first BJFE pedals were painted in nitrocellulose—beginning in 2002 the pedals are handpainted in oil.  Oil is much more durable, and ages well.  Björn Juhl states that the colors are chosen to provide a pleasant palette.  Each model comes with unique artwork inside the back pedal cover, painted by hand.

Models
Current models listed here, along with a description.  A more full description of all the BJFE pedals complete with their history can be found on the BJFE Pedal Descriptions independently maintained by  David Cittadini on the thread  on the BJFE Forum.

Fuzz
 Candy Apple Fuzz
 A crude fuzz, with octave function if needed and dying moans of gated fuzz
 Pink Purple Fuzz
 A more tame fuzz.  Here, the fuzz knobs act differently - The first half of rotation will give dynamic fuzz, suitable for overdrive, and second half will give compressed fuzz effects with most guitars.

Distortion and overdrive
BJFE overdrive pedals add a "touch sensitivity" to the distortion in most cases- picking lightly or slight reductione in the volume knob position reduce the distortion.

 Honeybee Overdrive
 The most dynamic, touch sensitive pedal from BJFE.   According to Björn, this pedal fits most styles and "stacks" well with most other pedals. On a clean-sounding amp HB can be used to get distortion on forceful notes as controlled by picking force. This can be used on guitars with flatwound strings for a mellow jazz sound or roundwound strings for a vintage style light distortion. In pedal systems with multiple drive pedals, HB can be connected last to soften the response and even give a low mid-range hump to bright amplifiers and provide a ceiling-effect for the upper treble frequencies.
 Dyna Red Distortion
 Distortion ranges from very light to heavy. It is used mostly for high gain sounds but it also matches particularly well for light "break up" tone with some amps.  The "drive" knob on this pedal controls the amount of distortion and sustain. Lower settings give uniform distortion patterns which will be input amplitude sensitive (i.e. the unit distorts more the harder you strike the strings).  There is no definite clipping point - but rather different shades of distortion as amplitude changes. Higher settings give more compression and less touch sensitive response, and at maximum output will be heavily compressed while still retaining clarity and increasing sustain.
 Emerald Green Distortion Machine
 Modeled after a VOX AC-15 Twin 10 amp.  EGDM gives a range of distorted sounds that are a bit less aggressive than the Dyna Red Distortion and also more compressed.  The distortion depth is a bit less than the Dyna Red Distortion as well.  This is done by use of a specific amplifier overload function and a slight ’ducking’ effect which can be noticed with high input levels. A specific equalizer curve is also used to complement this tone.

Research Models
 Model H (available through the BJFE Custom Shop)
 Sparkling Yellow Overdrive (available through the BJFE Custom Shop)

Compressor Pedals
 Pine Green Compressor
 Subtle compression pedal.  This was originally designed for a set of Beatles songs Björn's band was playing in, to give the kind of clean sound needed from the amp he was using. It works equally well with single coil, P90, and humbucking guitars  It was introduced as a model since Andreas of Custom Sounds Stockholm found Björn's old unit on one of the shelves at his store and asked to borrow it.

EQ Pedals
 Sea Blue EQ
 EQ in pedal form, designed to match the piezo-acoustic guitars and work as a booster addressing frequency bands with treble and bass controls that you don't find on your amp.  As a result the pedal allows you to further EQ beyond what your amp provides, while not fighting its own EQ.

Modulation Pedals
 Mighty Green Minivibe
 Designed to work primarily before distortion, and gives a traditional vibe sound.  This pedal does not have Univibe type sounds, but more vibrato.

Boost Pedals
 Baby Pink Booster
  Volume boost pedal. This is a booster pedal intended to use between a low-level instrument such as electric guitar and an amplifier. It’s intended to place in signal chain after overdrive pedals in order to boost level rather than distortion - hence its gain of 18dB (or 8 times). You can of course use it in front of an overdrive to boost the gain for more distortion.

Relationship to Mad Professor Amplification

Björn was asked by his BJFE pedal distributor, Harri Koski, to consider designing amplifiers.   Björn was fairly busy building and designing pedals for the BJFE line, and did not have the time to also build amplifiers. It was suggested a new company be created where Björn could design the effects and amplifiers, but they would be constructed and distributed under the name Mad Professor Amplification. These are pedals and amplifiers designed by Björn but not hand built by him.

References

External links
 BJFE User Forum, with user discussions and more detailed information on models
 Complete description of every known BJFE pedal
 Guide to stacking pedals written by Björn
 Custom Sounds, BJFE's main distributor
 Rare BJFE pedal gallery

Electronics companies of Sweden
Guitar effects manufacturing companies
Manufacturing companies based in Stockholm
Swedish brands